Morecambe is a railway station on the Morecambe Branch Line, which runs between  and . It is owned by Network Rail and managed by Northern Trains.

The current truncated two-platform station was opened on 29 May 1994, replacing the Midland Railway's earlier terminus, which was situated some  further west, closer to the town's seafront.

The old station building remains in use as a pub and restaurant, but its platforms have been demolished and the site is now occupied by a cinema and the Morecambe indoor market. That station was itself a replacement for the North Western Railway's original two-platform terminus at Northumberland Street, which opened in 1851 and closed in March 1907. It was located almost exactly on the same site as the current station and ticket office.

Facilities
Services are operated by a variety of diesel multiple units, including Class 150, Class 156 and Class 158 sets.

Terminating passenger services usually run into Platform 1. However, trains to/from Heysham must use the Platform 2 line in order to reverse and gain access to the single track Heysham branch. Heysham services (currently one return trip to Lancaster Mondays-Saturdays, and one return trip to Leeds on Sundays) access the Heysham section by means of a ground frame at the junction which is released by Preston signalling centre (which has supervised the branch since the closure of Bare Lane signal box in December 2012) and operated by the train crew.

The ticket office is staffed from the early morning until mid-afternoon, six days per week (closed Sundays). Passengers can purchase tickets (or a permit to travel) from a ticket vending machine at the station at other times. A waiting shelter is provided, along with a P.A system and digital information screens.  There is step-free access to the platform from the station entrance and ticket office.

Services

The station is served by Northern local services, which operate as a regular Lancaster-Morecambe shuttle.

Additionally, there is a limited service (one each way all week) to Heysham, connecting with the ferry to the Isle of Man. Trains for Heysham must reverse at Morecambe.

The token direct trains to Carnforth that ran up until the summer 2019 timetable change (one early morning Lancaster - Morecambe -  train, plus one weekday and three Sunday services to Leeds) have now been withdrawn. The Parliamentary train legal minimum service for the Bare Lane to Hest Bank North Junction chord is now provided by an early morning train from Lancaster, which runs via Carnforth (reverse) and the curve in question.

Future improvements
Northern's franchise agreement (started on 1 April 2016) includes provision for additional trains on the Leeds route - three additional weekday services were introduced from May 2018 (with trains timed to improve commuting and leisure opportunities at either end of the route) and one additional train each way on Sundays (the additional trains however start/terminate at Lancaster).

References

External links 
 
 

Railway stations in Lancaster
DfT Category F1 stations
Railway stations opened by Railtrack
Railway stations in Great Britain opened in 1994
Northern franchise railway stations
Buildings and structures in Morecambe